Interlac is a bimonthly amateur press association devoted to the DC Comics science fiction superhero team the Legion of Super-Heroes. It was the first APA devoted to the Legion and, despite the decline of APAs due to Internet forums, continues to operate to this day.  June 2021 marked the 45th anniversary.

Interlac’s name comes from the designated communication language of the 30th-century United Planets confederation (the milieu in which the Legion of Super-Heroes operates).

History 

Rich Morrissey founded the APA in June 1976, calling it LEAPA (the LEgion Amateur Press Association); it changed its name to Interlac three mailings later. There were 15 founding members, and the first mailing was 26 pages.

At the time, there were few general-interest comics APAs, CAPA-alpha and APA-5 being the exceptions. But never before in comic book fandom had the fans of a single comic book come together in a single APA. So while Interlac’s form came from CAPA-alpha, its membership came from the Legion Fan Club (started by 13-year-old Mike Flynn in 1972) and The Legion Outpost (a fanzine started in 1972).

In 1976, the Legion of Super-Heroes’ comic was finally on a solid footing, with the rich Legion mythos giving members plenty to discuss. As the roster grew—soon reaching its 50-member limit—it became clear that the APA had become a true community. Members met each other at comic book conventions and became real-life friends;  members Tom Bierbaum and Mary Gilmore met through the APA, began a romance, and eventually married. The Bierbaums later graduated from Interlac to working as scripters of the Legion comic itself.

The roster, with the exception of a few stalwarts, has turned over repeatedly, breathing fresh life and bringing new points of view into the forum. All the same, in 2000, eight of the 15 founders were still on the roster, waiting list, or honorary membership list, and four of the original 15 had remained on the roster continuously.

At one point, a spinoff APA devoted to music was formed, dubbed Quarternotes by its founders.

Policies 

 Membership
Interlac membership is limited to 50 roster slots. Minimum activity requirement is four collated and stapled pages in any three consecutive mailings. Applicants for membership send the Leader $10.00 to join the waitlist. A new waitlister receives a copy of the most recently available mailing and thereafter a Bulletin until becoming a member. Waitlisters are encouraged to submit contributions from the waitlist; for doing so, they’ll be eligible to purchase a copy of the mailing the contribution appears in. Any waitlister, having contributed at least ten pages, may be granted an extension of their invited period at the Leader’s discretion.

Honorary memberships have been awarded to former members of at least three years whose presence “significantly enriched Interlac and furthered its goals.” No more than one person per year may be awarded an honorary membership.

 Expenses
Divided evenly among the members, except the Leader(s) (to a maximum of two individuals at a time), who is exempt. Mailings for sale are available to members and waitlisters.

 Leadership elections
The Leader is elected by the majority of the voting membership to a one-year term. The Leader is responsible for distributing mailings, appointing a Deputy to serve in case of absence, setting deadlines, presenting a complete statement of the APA’s finances in each mailing’s Bulletin and interpreting the Constitution. The Leader is responsible for setting the copy count within a limit of 60.

Notable members (past and present) 

 Jim Shooter (founding member)
 Tom and Mary Bierbaum
 Dave Cockrum
 Colleen Doran
 Paul Levitz
 Tom McCraw
 Mark Waid
 Jim Chadwick

See also 

 Legion of Super-Heroes
 Amateur press association
 Interlac
 Science fiction fandom

References

External links
 

Legion of Super-Heroes
Comics fandom
Magazines about comics
Zines